The Supermarine Swift is a British single-seat jet fighter aircraft that was operated by the Royal Air Force (RAF). It was developed and manufactured by Supermarine during the 1940s and 1950s. The Swift featured many of the new jet age innovations, such as a swept wing. On 26 September 1953, a Swift F.4 piloted by Commander Mike Lithgow broke the world absolute speed record, reaching a speed of 737.7 mph (1,187 km/h).

After a protracted development period, the Swift entered service as an interceptor aircraft with the RAF in 1954. However, due to a spate of accidents incurred by the type, the Swift was grounded for a time, and had a relatively brief service life. The problems with the Swift led to a public scandal surrounding the development and performance of the aircraft, harming the reputations of the British government, the RAF, and the British aircraft industry.

Ultimately, the less problematic Hawker Hunter assumed much of the role intended for the Swift and only half as many Swifts were manufactured as had once been intended. A later photo reconnaissance variant of the Swift had resolved some of the teething problems, but that proved to be too late for it to regain favour. An advanced derivative of the Swift that was to be capable of transonic speeds, the Supermarine 545, was also under development during the early 1950s. However, it was cancelled in 1955, principally due to the poor performance of the Swift.

Design and development

Background
During 1945, the Second World War came to a close and a new post-war Labour government, headed by Clement Attlee, came to power in Britain. The incoming Attlee government's initial stance on defence was that no major conflict would occur for at least a decade, and thus there would be no need to develop or to procure any new aircraft until 1957. In accordance with that policy, aside from a small number of exceptions such as what would become the Hawker Sea Hawk for the Royal Navy, the majority of Specifications issued by the Air Ministry for fighter-sized aircraft during the late 1940s were restricted to research purposes. Aviation author Derek Wood refers to this policy as being: "a fatal error of judgement which was to cost Britain a complete generation of fighters and heavy bomber aircraft".

In part, the Swift had its origins in the experimental fighter prototypes that had been developed. Specifically, a number of Supermarine-built prototypes had been ordered under Specification E.41/46, which had sought the production of an experimental fighter aircraft furnished with a swept wing. The first of those prototypes was designated as the Type 510, which was heavily based on the straight-wing Supermarine Attacker, an early jet aircraft which was procured by the Fleet Air Arm (FAA) of the Royal Navy. The principal difference from the Attacker was that it had been modified with a swept wing configuration. During 1948, the Type 510 had conducted its maiden flight, a year after the first navalised prototype Attacker had flown. That flight made it the first British aircraft to fly with both swept wings and a swept tailplane. In trials for the Fleet Air Arm, the Type 510 was also the first swept-wing aircraft to take off from and land on an aircraft carrier.

During the late 1940s, in the face of the emerging Cold War, the RAF came to recognise that it would urgently require the development and procurement of fighters equipped with features such as swept wings. That need was felt to be so pressing that it was willing to accept interim fighter aircraft while more capable fighters were being developed. In 1950, with the outbreak of the Korean War, Britain's heavy involvement in that conflict led to a flurry of orders being placed. In particular, the RAF felt that a pair of proposed fighter aircraft from Hawker Aircraft and Supermarine were of great importance and, in the same year, ordered the proposed fighters "off the drawing board". The Supermarine design was designated as the Type 541, and was essentially an advanced development of the earlier Type 510 experimental aircraft.

The initial order placed in 1950 for 100 aircraft was intended to serve as an insurance policy in the event that Hawker failed to produce a viable aircraft. The two aircraft became known as the Supermarine Swift and the Hawker Hunter respectively. In early 1946, the Type 541 order was increased to 150 aircraft, while the Air Ministry had hopes that it would be able to enter service in advance of the rival Hunter. However, the development of both the Swift and the Hunter were protracted, having encountered several considerable technical challenges. According to Wood, that was in part due to a failure to procure interim aircraft equipped with swept wings, or to proceed with development of the Miles M.52. Wood describes the Swift as being "literally an attempt to squeeze a quart into a pint pot, with 30mm Aden guns, an afterburner, power controls, adequate fuel and a respectable high subsonic performance".

The Type 541 replaced its predecessors' Rolls-Royce Nene centrifugal flow turbojet engine with the axial-flow Rolls-Royce AJ.65 turbojet, which became the famed Avon series. The fuselage, which had been given a cross section suitable for the Nene engine, was not redesigned for the narrower AJ.65 and Avon engines, and retained a somewhat portly appearance. The plane was also equipped with a tricycle undercarriage. A pair of Type 541 prototypes were produced. The first made its maiden flight in 1951 and the second during the following year.

Into production
Production of the Swift had been declared to be a "super-priority" item under a policy created by Sir Winston Churchill, who had regained the position of Britain's prime minister in 1951, as a means of increasing projects considered to be of vital military importance. According to Wood, volume manufacturing commenced in advance of the implementation of modifications based on the results of flight experiences with the prototypes: "too much had been asked for in too little time and production aircraft were rolling off the production line before a major redesign could be accomplished".

The first production variant was a fighter designated the Swift F Mk 1, of which 18 were eventually built. It was powered by a single 7,500 lbf (33.4 kN)-thrust Avon 109 engine and carried an armament of two 30 mm ADEN cannons. On 25 August 1952, the first flight of a production standard Swift F 1 took place. Peter Thorne, who had been appointed as the senior RAF test pilot for the incoming Swift in 1954, came to doubt the aircraft's suitability. Thorne and several other pilots noted the Swift had unusual handling qualities, as well as a troublesome engine.

The second variant was the Swift F Mk 2, of which 16 were built. It was practically the same as the F 1, except for being fitted with two extra ADENs and the leading edge of the wing being altered from straight to a compound sweep configuration. However, the addition of the cannon caused problems, because the structural modifications required to house the increased ammunition load led to dangerous handling characteristics, and it was clear that more thrust was required from its engine. Numerous further modifications were required to resolve the problems.

The third Swift variant was the F Mk 3, of which 25 were built, powered by an Avon 114 engine with reheat. It was never put into operational service with the Royal Air Force and was used as an instructional airframe. The next variant was the F Mk.4, which included a variable incidence tailplane, intended to correct the handling problems that the Swift suffered from. It did fix the problem, but it was found that reheat could not be ignited at high altitude, adding to the Swift's list of problems.

The next in the line, the FR Mk 5, had a longer nose to accommodate a number of cameras to allow a reconnaissance role, as well as other modifications to its structure. The FR 5 also reverted to the F 1's twin ADEN cannon armament. It first flew in 1955 and entered service the following year, performing reconnaissance mainly at low level, making the reheat problem at high altitude irrelevant.

Two further variants were designed. The PR Mk 6 was an unarmed photo reconnaissance plane. However, its use was short-lived, due to the ever-present reheat problems. The last variant was the F Mk 7, which was the first Swift model to be fitted with guided missiles, the Fairey Fireflash air-to-air missile,  and was powered by a new model of the Avon engine. Only fourteen F 7 aircraft were built and none ever entered service with the RAF, being relegated – along with its prototype missiles – to conducting guided-missile trials duties only.

Proposed derivative

In 1953, as a response to growing RAF interest in developing transonic aircraft to serve as a stopgap while the next generation of supersonic fighters were being developed, both Supermarine and Hawker proposed derivatives of their respective Swift and Hunter aircraft. By that time, the shortcomings of the Swift were not yet apparent, which perhaps had allowed Supermarine to gain the RAF's favour for its proposal, designated as the Type 545, over the rival Hawker P.1083. The Type 545 had been drawn up to conform with the requirements given by Specification F.105D. It was to have been capable of attaining Mach 1.3. powered by an Avon engine, promising superior performance to that of the P.1083. The Type 545 bore a resemblance to the Swift, although it was a complete redesign, having an area-ruled fuselage and wing changes. In 1955, work on the project was cancelled, in part due to the considerable difficulties experienced with the Swift.

Operational history

In February 1954, the Swift F 1 entered service with the RAF, No. 56 Squadron becoming the first RAF squadron to operate the type. With its introduction, the Swift became the RAF's first swept-wing aircraft. The Swift F 2 entered service that same month. Wood refers to the type's introduction as having been "panicked", and that the adoption soon proved to be an "abysmal failure". Tragedy struck very early in the career of the Swift: there were a number of accidents that involved the F 1 and F 2, one of them being fatal. In August 1954, it was decided that the Swift F 1 would be grounded, and the Swift F 2, which had effectively replaced the F 1 that same month, was also soon grounded as well, for similar reasons.

The Swift F 3 and F 4 fighters were noted to have improved performance over their predecessors. The F 4 was the last variant that the RAF would accept in an interceptor role. All fighter variants of the Swift were withdrawn from service by the RAF after a short time in service, to be replaced by the more capable Hawker Hunter. While subject to its own problems, the Hunter had quickly proved to be a successful fighter aircraft. By autumn 1954, the problems with the Swift had become public knowledge, and reports of the pending cancellation of the Swift appeared in the national press. In Parliament, Under-Secretary of State for Air Sir George Ward said of the aircraft: "Aerodynamic difficulties have been encountered, and it is not possible to say with certainty if they can be overcome in the version under development".

In early February 1955, it was rumoured that the Swift had failed its final evaluation by the RAF Central Fighter Establishment, and that the type was likely to be restricted to aerial reconnaissance or to ground attack roles. On 2 March 1955, Minister of Supply Selwyn Lloyd acknowledged that development of the Swift had cost £20 million prior to the scrapping of the fighter variants. According to Wood, the Swift had become a national scandal by early 1955, which not only tarnished the aircraft, but also the RAF and the British aircraft industry, with the public and the government generally becoming more averse to other aircraft projects.

The FR.5 was the last Swift variant to enter service with the RAF and was eventually replaced by the Hunter FR.10, with the FR.5 leaving RAF service entirely in 1961. The Swift FR. 5 had been deemed suitable for its role and was based with two squadrons that were assigned to RAF Germany. The Swift never saw combat action with the RAF, but it did break a number of speed records in its time. In Libya, on 26 September 1953, an F.4 (WK198) piloted by Commander Mike Lithgow broke the world absolute speed record, reaching a speed of 737.7 mph (1,187 km/h), though it was broken just eight days later by the Douglas Skyray, a United States Navy (USN) fighter. The Swift has the distinction of being the last British production aircraft to hold the record (the Fairey Delta 2 was experimental). Fewer than two hundred Swifts were built from an order of 497. A number of Swift airframes were taken to Australia for Operation Buffalo in 1956, being placed at various distances from a detonating atomic bomb.

Its last variant had resolved many of the problems that had plagued earlier Swifts but the programme was not continued. The Hunter, performing satisfactorily in the same roles, removed any requirement to persist with the Swift.

Variants

Type 510
Prototype developed from the Vickers Supermarine Attacker still with a tailwheel undercarriage but with swept wings and tail.
Type 517
Prototype fitted with a variable incidence tailplane.
Type 535
Prototype fitted with a nosewheel undercarriage.
Swift F.Mk 1
Single-seat fighter aircraft, fitted with a fixed variable-incidence tailplane, powered by a Rolls-Royce Avon RA-7/109 turbojet engine without an afterburner,  armed with two 30-mm ADEN cannons.
Swift F.Mk 2
Single-seat fighter aircraft, armed with four 30-mm ADEN cannon.
Swift F.Mk 3
Single-seat fighter aircraft, powered by an afterburning Rolls-Royce Avon RA-7A/114 turbojet engine, armed with two 30-mm ADEN cannon.
Swift F.Mk 4
Single-seat fighter aircraft, fitted with a variable-incidence tailplane.
Swift FR.Mk 5
Single-seat tactical-reconnaissance aircraft, fitted with a lengthened nose to accommodate three cameras, equipped with a frameless cockpit canopy, powered by a Rolls-Royce Avon 114 turbojet engine, armed with two 30-mm ADEN cannon.
Swift F.Mk 7
Single-seat fighter aircraft, fitted with a lengthened nose to accommodate a radar, armed with two Fairey Fireflash air-to-air missiles and no cannon.

Operators

 Royal Air Force
 No. 2 Squadron RAF operated FR.5 variant.
 No. 4 Squadron RAF operated FR.5 variant.
 No. 56 Squadron RAF operated F.1 and F.2 variants.
 No. 79 Squadron RAF operated FR.5 variant.

Survivors

VV106 (Supermarine Type 517) is stored by the Fleet Air Arm Museum, Yeovilton, England.
WK198 (the F.4 prototype, fuselage only) this former World Air Speed record holder is on display at Brooklands Museum, Surrey; it was first preserved at the North East Aircraft Museum, Sunderland, England, on 2 April 2008 it was relocated to the RAF Millom Museum, Cumbria, but with that museum's closure in September 2010, WK198 was transferred to Brooklands on 3 February 2011.
WK275 (F.4) Having spent four years being restored to exhibition standard by Jet Art Aviation, this aircraft is now on loan to the Vulcan To The Sky Trust. It represents the definitive fighter variant with slab tail.
WK277 (FR.5) on display at the Newark Air Museum, Newark, England.
WK281 (FR.5) on display at the Tangmere Military Aviation Museum, Tangmere, England.
G-SWIF (F.7, the former XF114) is stored by Solent Sky, Southampton, England.

Specifications (Supermarine Swift FR Mk.5)

Notable appearances in media

See also

References

Citations

Bibliography
 
 Buttler, Tony. X-Planes of Europe II: Military Prototype Aircraft from the Golden Age 1946–1974. Manchester, UK: Hikoki Publications, 2015. 
 Winchester, Jim. The World's Worst Aircraft: From Pioneering Failures to Multimillion Dollar Disasters. London: Amber Books, 2005. 
 Wood, Derek. Project Cancelled. Macdonald and Jane's Publishers, 1975.

Further reading
 Birtles, Philip. Supermarine Attacker, Swift and Scimitar (Postwar Military Aircraft 7). London: Ian Allan, 1992. .
 Curry, Alan and Frank Goodridge. "The Rise and Fall of the Swift." FlyPast: Key Publications, May and July 1987.
 Taylor, John W.R. "Supermarine Swift." Combat Aircraft of the World from 1909 to the present. New York: G.P. Putnam's Sons, 1969. .
 Walpole, Nigel. Swift Justice, the full story of the Supermarine Swift. Pen and Sword Books Ltd. 2004.

External links

Swift at Thunder and Lightnings
Picture of a Swift F.Mk.1
Picture of an early Swift
Picture of the Supermarine 510 VV106

1950s British fighter aircraft
Swift
Single-engined jet aircraft
Aircraft first flown in 1948